Elizabeth Hayward may refer to:
 Elizabeth Pugsley Hayward (1854–1942), member of the Utah House of Representatives and Utah State Senate
 Elizabeth Steiner Hayward, member of the Oregon Senate